</noinclude>

Henry Bolton (1842 – 29 March 1900), was a brewer and politician in colonial Victoria.

Bolton was the son of James Bolton, a farmer and civil engineer, and his wife Mary Fynn of Galway, Ireland, where he was born in 1842. He came to Victoria in 1861, and began as a brewer at Heathcote, removing to Seymour in 1869. He was president of the Seymour Shire Council, and having unsuccessfully contested Moira in the Liberal interest in 1877, was returned to the Legislative Assembly for that constituency in 1880. He was Postmaster-General in the Bryan O'Loghlen Government from July 1881 to March 1883. He subsequently retired from public life in Victoria, and commenced business in Queensland. Bolton married, in 1866, Annie, second daughter of James Eagan, of the Major's Line Station.

References

1842 births
1900 deaths
Members of the Victorian Legislative Assembly
19th-century Australian politicians
Politicians from Galway (city)
Irish emigrants to colonial Australia
Australian brewers
19th-century Australian businesspeople